Pekkle (Ahiru no Pekkle) is a fictional character created by Sanrio in 1990. The character is a small white duck who typically wears a blue T-shirt that has the letter P on it. Pekkle is characterized as "good-natured" and "kind," as well as being a singer and dancer. For example, the character takes tap-dancing lessons. Pekkle's birthday is on July 27.

Pekkle appeared in four OVAs in the early 1990s.

References

Child characters in animation
Child characters in anime and manga
Child characters in television
Fictional ducks
Sanrio characters
Fictional characters introduced in 1990